Connor Sun-Han Wong (born May 19, 1996) is an American professional baseball catcher and infielder for the Boston Red Sox of Major League Baseball (MLB). He made his MLB debut in June 2021, prior to which he played every position except pitcher in the minor leagues.

Amateur career
Wong attended Pearland High School in Pearland, Texas, where he played baseball. In his senior year of 2014, he earned all-state honors as a shortstop. After not being selected in the 2014 MLB draft, he enrolled at the University of Houston where he played college baseball for the Cougars.

In 2015, Wong's freshman season at Houston, he started 62 of Houston's 63 games at shortstop, hitting .248 with six home runs and 37 runs batted in (RBIs). That summer, he played in the Cape Cod Baseball League with the Yarmouth–Dennis Red Sox. As a sophomore in 2016, he started all 59 games and saw time at catcher, third base, and the outfield; for the season, Wong had a slash line of .304/.415/.435 with five home runs and 30 RBIs, earning all-conference first-team honors in the American Athletic Conference. He returned to the Cape Cod League that summer, playing 41 games with the Bourne Braves, batting .313 with three home runs and earning all-star honors. In 2017, Wong's junior year at Houston, he began catching full-time. For the season, he started all 63 of Houston's games, slashing .287/.379/.494 with 12 home runs, 36 RBIs, and 26 stolen bases. After the season, he was selected by the Los Angeles Dodgers in the third round of the 2017 MLB draft.

Professional career

Los Angeles Dodgers
Wong signed with the Dodgers and made his professional debut with the rookie-level Arizona League Dodgers before being promoted to the Great Lakes Loons of the Class A Midwest League after one game; over 28 games for the season, Wong hit .276 with five home runs and 18 RBIs. In 2018, Wong played for the Rancho Cucamonga Quakes of the Class A-Advanced California League (with whom he earned all-star honors), slashing .269/.350/.480 with 19 home runs and 60 RBIs over 102 games. Wong returned to the Quakes to begin 2019, earning all-star honors for the second straight year, before being promoted to the Tulsa Drillers of the Double-A Texas League in July. Over 111 games between the two clubs, he slashed .281/.336/.541 with 24 home runs, 82 RBIs, and 11 stolen bases.

Boston Red Sox
On February 10, 2020, Wong was traded to the Boston Red Sox along with Jeter Downs and Alex Verdugo in exchange for Mookie Betts, David Price and cash considerations. After the 2020 minor league season was cancelled due to the COVID-19 pandemic, Wong was invited to participate in the Red Sox' fall instructional league. On November 20, 2020, he was added to the 40-man roster.

To begin the 2021 season, Wong was assigned to the Triple-A Worcester Red Sox. On June 22, he was promoted to the major leagues for the first time and made his major-league debut against the Tampa Bay Rays as a pinch runner in extra innings. He recorded his first MLB hit on June 26, a single against Jordan Montgomery of the New York Yankees. Wong was optioned back to Worcester and recalled to Boston several times from July to September. Wong played in a total of six games for Boston, batting 4-for-13 (.308) with one RBI. He also made 50 appearances for Worcester, batting .256 with eight home runs and 26 RBIs. After the regular season, Wong was selected to play in the Arizona Fall League.

Wong began the 2022 season in Triple-A; he was called up to Boston on April 18 when Kevin Plawecki was placed on the COVID-related list. The next evening, Wong hit a sacrifice fly to drive in the winning run in a 2–1 victory over the Toronto Blue Jays. Wong was optioned back to Worcester on April 25, when Plawecki returned to the team. Wong later spent parts of July with Boston. He sustained a hand injury on July 29 when he was hit by a pitch in a Triple-A contest, causing him to miss multiple games. On September 1, when MLB active rosters expanded from 26 to 28 players, Wong was recalled to Boston. On September 2, he hit his first major-league home run, coming against the Texas Rangers at Fenway Park. Wong made 27 appearances for Boston during the season, batting .188 with one home run and seven RBIs. He also played 81 games for Triple-A Worcester, batting .288 with 15 home runs and 44 RBIs.

References

External links

1996 births
Living people
American baseball players of Chinese descent
Arizona League Dodgers players
Baseball players from Houston
Boston Red Sox players
Bourne Braves players
Great Lakes Loons players
Houston Cougars baseball players
Major League Baseball catchers
Rancho Cucamonga Quakes players
Tulsa Drillers players
Yarmouth–Dennis Red Sox players
Worcester Red Sox players
Scottsdale Scorpions players
Pearland High School alumni